The 2010 Six-red World Championship (often styled the 2010 SangSom 6-red World Championship for sponsorship and marketing purposes) was a six-red snooker tournament that took place between 19 and 24 July 2010 at the Montien Riverside Hotel in Bangkok, Thailand.

Twenty-eight of the tournament's 48 competitors were currently on the main tour of the more established 15-reds game. A relatively high proportion of competitors were from Asia.

Mark Selby won in the final 8–6 against Ricky Walden.


Round-robin stage
The top four players from each group qualified for the knock-out stage. All matches were best of 9 frames.

Group A

 James Mifsud 4–5 Noppon Saengkham
 Jimmy White 4–5 Dave Harold
 Darren Morgan 5–2 Sitthidead Sackbiang
 Jimmy White 5–2 Noppon Saengkham
 Darren Morgan 5–1 James Mifsud
 Darren Morgan 5–3 Noppon Saengkham
 Jimmy White 5–0 James Mifsud
 Sitthidead Sackbiang 5–3 James Mifsud
 Darren Morgan 2–5 Dave Harold
 Sitthidead Sackbiang 0–5 Dave Harold
 Noppon Saengkham 5–4 Dave Harold
 Jimmy White 5–3 Darren Morgan
 Jimmy White 5–1 Sitthidead Sackbiang
 James Mifsud 2–5 Dave Harold
 Sitthidead Sackbiang 1–5 Noppon Saengkham

Group B

 Stuart Pettman 5–1 Hassan Samir 	
 Issara Kachaiwong 5–3 Ken Doherty
 Mark Williams 5–2 Ken Doherty
 Stuart Pettman 5–1 Scott MacKenzie
 Mark Williams 5–1 Issara Kachaiwong
 Hassan Samir 1–5 Issara Kachaiwong
 Mark Williams 3–5 Scott MacKenzie
 Mark Williams 1–5 Hassan Samir
 Scott MacKenzie 5–2 Ken Doherty
 Stuart Pettman 2–5 Issara Kachaiwong
 Mark Williams 3–5 Stuart Pettman
 Scott MacKenzie 5–3 Issara Kachaiwong
 Hassan Samir 1–5 Ken Doherty
 Stuart Pettman 2–5 Ken Doherty
 Hassan Samir 2–5 Scott MacKenzie

Group C

 Mark Selby 2–5 Stuart Bingham  	
 Mark Selby 5–3 Igor Figueiredo
 Glen Wilkinson 2–5 Thepchaiya Un-Nooh
 Igor Figueiredo 2–5 Stuart Bingham
 Yasin Merchant 0–5 Glen Wilkinson
 Yasin Merchant 1–5 Thepchaiya Un-Nooh
 Igor Figueiredo 3–5 Glen Wilkinson
 Mark Selby 5–1 Yasin Merchant
 Igor Figueiredo 2–5 Thepchaiya Un-Nooh
 Glen Wilkinson 0–5 Stuart Bingham
 Igor Figueiredo 5–4 Yasin Merchant
 Thepchaiya Un-Nooh 3–5 Stuart Bingham
 Mark Selby 5–0 Glen Wilkinson
 Mark Selby 5–1 Thepchaiya Un-Nooh
 Yasin Merchant 2–5 Stuart Bingham

Group D

 Fung Kwok Wai 2–5 Gerard Greene 	
 Andrew Paget 5–2 Manan Chandra
 Nigel Bond 3–5 James Wattana
 Andrew Paget 5–4 Fung Kwok Wai
 Manan Chandra 4–5 James Wattana
 Nigel Bond 4–5 Gerard Greene
 Fung Kwok Wai 5–2 James Wattana
 Nigel Bond 5–1 Manan Chandra
 Andrew Paget 0–5 James Wattana
 Nigel Bond 5–3 Fung Kwok Wai
 Manan Chandra 4–5 Gerard Greene
 James Wattana 5–3 Gerard Greene
 Nigel Bond 5–4 Andrew Paget
 Manan Chandra 4–5 Fung Kwok Wai
 Andrew Paget 5–1 Gerard Greene

Group E

 Jamie Cope 5–3 Judd Trump 	
 Yu Delu 2–5 Jamie Jones
 Habib Subah 2–5 Noppadon Noppachorn
 Jamie Jones 5–1 Noppadon Noppachorn
 Yu Delu 2–5 Judd Trump
 Jamie Cope 5–4 Yu Delu
 Habib Subah 1–5 Jamie Jones
 Noppadon Noppachorn 3–5 Judd Trump
 Jamie Cope 4–5 Habib Subah
 Jamie Jones 5–1 Judd Trump
 Jamie Cope 5–4 Noppadon Noppachorn
 Yu Delu 5–2 Habib Subah
 Jamie Cope 1–5 Jamie Jones
 Yu Delu 0–5 Noppadon Noppachorn
 Habib Subah 1–5 Judd Trump

Group F

 Joe Swail 5–3 Thanawat Thirapongpaiboon 	
 Peter Ebdon 5–3 Sam Craigie
 Mohammed Shehab 0–5 Mark Davis
 Sam Craigie 3–5 Thanawat Thirapongpaiboon
 Peter Ebdon 5–3 Mark Davis
 Joe Swail 2–5 Sam Craigie
 Peter Ebdon 1–5 Mohammed Shehab
 Thanawat Thirapongpaiboon 1–5 Mark Davis
 Peter Ebdon 5–1 Thanawat Thirapongpaiboon
 Joe Swail 5–4 Mohammed Shehab
 Sam Craigie 1–5 Mark Davis
 Mohammed Shehab 5–3 Thanawat Thirapongpaiboon
 Peter Ebdon 5–4 Joe Swail
 Mohammed Shehab 5–1 Sam Craigie
 Joe Swail 5–0 Mark Davis

Group G

 Patrick Einsle 2–5 Passakorn Suwannawat 	
 Joe Perry 4–5 Michael Holt
 Joe Perry 5–3 Mohamed Khairy
 Passakorn Suwannawat 2–5 Michael Holt
 Alfie Burden 3–5 Patrick Einsle
 Joe Perry 4–5 Alfie Burden
 Mohamed Khairy 0–5 Michael Holt
 Alfie Burden 5–2 Passakorn Suwannawat
 Joe Perry 5–2 Patrick Einsle
 Mohamed Khairy 2–5 Passakorn Suwannawat
 Alfie Burden 5–1 Mohamed Khairy
 Patrick Einsle 4–5 Michael Holt
 Joe Perry 5–1 Passakorn Suwannawat
 Alfie Burden 4–5 Michael Holt
 Mohamed Khairy 5–2 Patrick Einsle

Group H

 Mohammed Al-Joakar 2–5 Supoj Saenla 	
 Ricky Walden 4–5 Barry Hawkins
 Muhammad Sajjad 5–3 Supoj Saenla
 Liu Chuang 5–1 Mohammed Al-Joakar
 Ricky Walden 5–4 Muhammad Sajjad
 Liu Chuang 0–5 Barry Hawkins
 Muhammad Sajjad 2–5 Barry Hawkins
 Liu Chuang 2–5 Supoj Saenla
 Ricky Walden 5–3 Mohammed Al-Joakar
 Supoj Saenla 5–2 Barry Hawkins
 Ricky Walden 5–4 Liu Chuang
 Muhammad Sajjad 5–1 Mohammed Al-Joakar
 Ricky Walden 5–1 Supoj Saenla
 Mohammed Al-Joakar 1–5 Barry Hawkins
 Liu Chuang 3–5 Muhammad Sajjad

Knockout stage

Maximum breaks 
(Note a maximum break in six-red snooker is 75)
 Andrew Pagett (x2)
 Jimmy White (x2)
 Stuart Bingham
 Jamie Cope
 Jamie Jones
 Barry Hawkins
 Thepchaiya Un-Nooh
 James Wattana

References

External links

2010
Six-red World Championship
Six-red World Championship